An annular solar eclipse occurred on July 31, 1962. A solar eclipse occurs when the Moon passes between Earth and the Sun, thereby totally or partly obscuring the image of the Sun for a viewer on Earth. An annular solar eclipse occurs when the Moon's apparent diameter is smaller than the Sun's, blocking most of the Sun's light and causing the Sun to look like an annulus (ring). An annular eclipse appears as a partial eclipse over a region of the Earth thousands of kilometres wide. Occurring only 4.7 days before apogee (Apogee on August 5, 1962), the Moon's apparent diameter was larger. This solar eclipse occurred 44 days after the final game of 1962 FIFA World Cup.

Places inside the annular eclipse included Venezuela, northern Roraima in Brazil, Guyana, Dutch Guiana (today's Suriname) including the capital city Paramaribo, Senegal, Gambia Colony and Protectorate (today's Gambia) including the southern part of the capital city Banjul, Mali including the capital city Bamako, Upper Volta (today's Burkina Faso), Ghana, Togo, Dahomey (today's Benin), Nigeria, Cameroon including the capital city Yaoundé, Congo-Brazzaville, Congo-Léopoldville (today's DR Congo), Tanganyika (now belonging to Tanzania), northeastern tip of Portuguese Mozambique (today's Mozambique), French Comoros (today's Comoros), Mayotte, and the Malagasy Republic (today's Madagascar). The greatest eclipse was in the area of Kouoro, Mali at 12 N, 5.7 W at 12:25 (UTC) and lasted for 3 minutes.

Related eclipses

Solar eclipses of 1961–1964

Saros 135 

It is a part of Saros cycle 135, repeating every 18 years, 11 days, containing 71 events. The series started with partial solar eclipse on July 5, 1331. It contains annular eclipses from October 21, 1511 through February 24, 2305, hybrid eclipses on March 8, 2323 and March 18, 2341 and total eclipses from March 29, 2359 through May 22, 2449. The series ends at member 71 as a partial eclipse on August 17, 2593. The longest duration of totality will be 2 minutes, 27 seconds on May 12, 2431.

Inex series

Metonic series

Notes

References 

1962 7 31
1962 7 31
1962 in science
July 1962 events